Lieutenant-Commander Harold Ernest Perrin CBE (c.1878–9 April 1948) was a British aviation pioneer. He was secretary of the Royal Aero Club from 1903 to 1945, and in this capacity signed more than 20,000 private pilots' licences. Perrin was made a Commander of the Order of the British Empire (CBE) in 1936.

1870s births
1948 deaths
Commanders of the Order of the British Empire
British aviators
Royal Navy officers